The Gulbarga Fort is located in Kalaburagi in the Kalaburagi district of North Karnataka. It was subsequently significantly enlarged in 1347 by Al-ud-din Hasan Bahmani of the Bahmani Dynasty after he cut off his ties with the Delhi Sultanate; Islamic monuments such as mosques, palaces, tombs, and other structures were also built later within the refurbished fort. The Jama Masjid built later, within the fort, in 1367, is a unique structure built in Persian architectural style, fully enclosed, with elegant domes and arched columns, which is unlike any other mosque in India. It was built to commemorate the establishment of the dynastic rule of the Bahmani kingdom at Kalaburagi fort between 1327 and 1424. It remained the capital of the Bahmani Kingdom till 1424 where after the capital was shifted to Bidar Fort, as Bidar had better climatic conditions.

History
The early history of the region dates back to the 6th century when the Rashtrakutas ruled over the external areas, except Gulbarga. The Chalukyas won back their domain and ruled for over two hundred years. The Kalachuris of Kalyani succeeded them and ruled till the 12th century. At the end of the 12th century, it came under the reign of the Yadavas of Devagiri and the Hoysalas of Halebid. During this period, the Kakatiya dynasty, kings of Warangal were also powerful and took control of the present-day Kalaburagi district and Raichur district.

The Kakatiya power was subdued in 1321, and the northern Deccan, including the district of Gulbarga, passed under the control of the Sultanate of Delhi.

In the early 14th century, the Deccan was occupied by Muhammad bin Tughluq of the Delhi Sultanate, which included Gulbarga. The revolt of the Muslim officers appointed from Delhi resulted in the founding of the Bahmani Sultanate in 1347 by Alauddin Hassan, who chose Gulbarga (named as 'Ahsenabad' during this period) to be his capital. Gulbarga was the capital of the Bahmani kingdom (1347–1527) (with headquarters at the Gulbarga Fort), a newly founded independent state, until 1424 when the capital was transferred to Bidar. It is said that with the establishment of the Bahmani Kingdom, the Muslim rule took firm roots in the Deccan. Ahmad Shah Wali Bahmani had inducted immigrants from Iraq, Iran and Central Asia, which changed the social, cultural and religious life in the Deccan but was well amalgamated with Hindu traditions.

The fort was razed to the ground by the Vijayanagar Emperor but was subsequently rebuilt by the Adil Shah dynasty or Bijapur Sultanate, when the Vijayanagar empire was defeated in battle of talikota.

World’s longest cannon at Bahmani Fort 
The Bahmanis ruled over most of the Deccan until the late 15th and early 16th century, when the kingdom was divided into five independent states.

The Mughal Emperor Aurangzeb (1658–1707) captured the fort in the 17th century (1687) and appointed Asaf Jah I ("Nizam-ul-Mulk") as the governor of the Deccan. In the early part of the 18th century, when Mughal Empire was declining, the Nizam became independent in 1724, and formed the Hyderabad State, of which Gulbarga area was a part.

The fort and the Gulbarga district were a part of Kingdom of Hyderabad under the Nizams rule. After India became independent in August 1947, Hyderabad state was annexed to the Indian union in 1948. In 1956, the Indian state of Hyderabad was partitioned among neighbouring states along linguistic lines and renamed as Andhra Pradesh (now Telangana). Most of the Gulbarga district became part of the then Mysore State, later renamed Karnataka, excluding two taluks, which were given to Andhra Pradesh.

Geography
It is located on a plateau land in the northeastern part of Karnataka. Krishna River and Bhima River drain the district. The soil formation in the region is predominantly of black cotton soil.

Climate is dry and cold in the winter but summer is hot. South west monsoon brings rains.

Structures
With the establishment of the Bahmani Kingdom in the Deccan from 1347, the architectural styles of the Persian architecture of Iran made impressive and lasting impacts, which are seen in the fort. The mosques, arches, gardens, and the palaces were built within and also outside the fort in the Kalaburagi town. Within the fort, the buildings built are impressive with Indo-Persian architecture that evolved in the Deccan. Professor Desai has observed: A distinct Indo-Persian architectural style of Deccan came into existence after the establishment of the Bahmani dynasty in 1347.
Some of the important structures built are elaborated.

Fort 
It is well fortified with double fortification.

It is said that the Bahmani Sultanate claimed lineage of the Sasanians and the motifs on their buildings, particularly the crowns of the arches that they built depicted an emblem of the crescent and occasionally a disk that was closely reminiscent of the crowns of the Sassanian emperors. Many religious or secular buildings in the fort area depict this emblem.

Jami Masjid 
The mosque, one of the first in South India, was built to commemorate Gulbarga as the capital of the Bahmani Sultanate. The mosque though simple in design but has a symmetrical plan with well organized constituent parts. The masjid, only one of its kind in India, has dimensions of x and was built on the lines of the Great Mosque of Córdoba in Spain. The masjid, which was in ruins, has been well tended now.

The mosque has no open courtyard. The outer passageways surround the prayer hall on three sides and have low open arcades with arches. They form a rectangular layout with ten bays each on the north and the south, and seven bays on the east. The square bays on the corners are topped by domes. The roofed interior bays are covered with low domes, faceted by pendentives. The front yard in front of the mihrab has nine bays with a single large dome. Trefoil interiors and elongated lobes are seen on sloping arches of the drum. The main roof drum is mounted on a cubic clerestory. The wooden screens that existed on the outer arcade openings have been removed over the years. They have been replaced, in recent times, by an arched entrance portal on the north face. On the whole, the mosque displays distinct Persian architectural style with five large domes (One large and four small at the corners) and 75 small domes with 250 arches.

Tomb of Khaja Bande Nawaz 

Apart from the above monuments the other building of interest is the tomb of the Sufi saint Syed Mohammad Gesu Daraz, popularly known as Khwaja Bande Nawaz, built in the Indo-Saracenic style. It is a large complex where the tomb of the Sufi saint, who came to Gulbarga in 1413, exists. The tomb walls have paintings; the arches of the Dargah are in Bahmani architecture while the paintings on the walls and ceiling have a fusion of Turkish and Irani influence. The Mughals also built a mosque close to the tomb. An annual fair or Urs is held here in November, which attracts large number of devotees of all religious communities.

According to painter and scholar Rehman Patel, who provided the photograph and other details of the Feroze Shah lake, says that this rare photograph finds a place in the album that was made for the Nizam.

A study of the 19th Century photographs in India would be incomplete without a study of the prolific works of photographs by Raja Lal Deen Dayal. At a time when the world of the photograph was dominated by British and European photographers, Mr. Dayal was the sole Indian who photographed extensively and was immensely sought-after.

The sixth Nizam Mir Mahboob Ali Khan had conferred the prestigious ‘Musawwir Jung Raja Bahadur’ or ‘Bold Warrior of Photography’ title on Mr. Dayal.

Access
Kalaburagi is well connected by railway lines and roads. It is an important rail head on the Central Southern Railway zone line connecting to Bangalore, Mumbai, Delhi and Hyderabad.

Road distances to other cities within the state are: Basavakalyan-, Bidar -, Raichur -   and Bijapur - .

Kalaburagi Airport is the nearest airport.

Gallery

References

External links

Forts in Karnataka
Kalaburagi
Buildings and structures in Kalaburagi district